Suzanne Enoch (born California) is an American author of best-selling contemporary and historical Regency romance novels.

Enoch began writing down her own stories when she was a child. She graduated from the University of California, Irvine with a degree in English.  Her first attempts at writing were in the romantic fantasy genre, but she soon began writing Regency romances.  Her first novel, The Black Duke's Prize, was published by Avon in 1995.  She finally quit her full-time job in 2002 to devote herself to writing.

Although Enoch has had great success writing Regency romances, in 2005 she published her first contemporary romantic suspense novel.  She has continued to write in both genres, telling an interviewer that "I think working in one genre replenishes my energy for the other."  Her novels have appeared on The New York Times Best Seller list as well as those compiled by USAToday and Publishers Weekly.

Awards
1998 - Romantic Times Reviewer's Choice Award nominee for Regency of the Year, Angel's Devil

Bibliography

Regencies
The Black Duke's Prize (1995)
Angel's Devil (1995)

Lady Rogue (1997)
Stolen Kisses (1997)
1818: Isabel (The Legend of Nimway Hall, multi-author series) (2018)
Something in the Heir (2022)

The Bancroft Brothers
By Love Undone (1998)
Taming Rafe (1999)

With This Ring
Reforming a Rake (2000)
Meet Me at Midnight (2000)
A Matter of Scandal (2001)

Lessons in Love
The Rake (2002)
London's Perfect Scoundrel (2003)
England's Perfect Hero (2004)

The Griffin Family
Sin and Sensibility (2004)
An Invitation to Sin (2005)
Something Sinful (2006)
Sins of a Duke (2007)

The Notorious Gentlemen
After the Kiss (2008)
Before the Scandal (2008)
Always A Scoundrel (2009)

The Adventurers' Club
The Care and Taming of a Rogue (2009)
A Lady's Guide to Improper Behavior (2010)
Rules of an Engagement (2010)

Samantha Jellicoe series
Flirting with Danger (December 2005)
Don't Look Down (March 2005)
Billionaires Prefer Blondes (October 2006)
Twice the Temptation (July 2007)
A Touch of Minx (September 2007)
Barefoot in the Dark (August 2018)

The Scandalous Brides
A Beginner’s Guide to Rakes (2011)
"The Wicked One: A Beginner's Guide to Rakes Prequel," short story (2012)
Taming an Impossible Rogue (2012)
Rules to Catch a Devilish Duke (2012)
The Handbook to Handling His Lordship (2013)

Scandalous Highlanders
"One Hot Scot," short story in Christmas Brides (2013)
The Devil Wears Kilts (2013)
Rogue with a Brogue (2014)
Mad, Bad, and Dangerous in Plaid (2015)
Some Like it Scot (2015)

No Ordinary Hero
Hero in the Highlands (2016)
My One True Highlander (2017)
A Devil in Scotland (2018)

Wild Wicked Highlanders 

It's Getting Scot in Here (2019)
Scot Under the Covers (2020)
Hit Me With Your Best Scot (2021)

Short Stories 
"Good Earl Hunting" (2012), standalone
"One True Love" in The Further Observations of Lady Whistledown (2003)
"The Best of Both Worlds" in Lady Whistledown Strikes Back (2004)
"Take Two" in I Loved You First (2020)
"Great Scot!" in Kissing Under the Mistletoe (2021)

References

External links
 Suzanne Enoch Official Website

20th-century American novelists
21st-century American novelists
American romantic fiction writers
American women novelists
Living people
University of California, Irvine alumni
20th-century American women writers
21st-century American women writers
Year of birth missing (living people)